Edward J. Repka (born October 22, 1960) is an American graphic artist, best known for creating album covers for metal bands as well as shirt designs, including those featuring Megadeth's mascot Vic Rattlehead. Repka's portfolio also includes Dark Angel's logo and model designs for the Hellraiser films. He works for the National Entertainment Collectibles Association as their lead painter and head of art direction.

Repka's artwork based on the original Universal Studios film The Wolf Man was used as the cover art for the first issue of horror magazine HorrorHound.

Repka admits that despite being known as the "King of Thrash Metal Art," he is not a big fan of the genre. He is more into the punk genre like the Misfits.

List of works 

 3 Inches of Blood – Advance & Vanquish
 Aggression (Spanish band) – Moshpirit
 After All – Dawn of the Enforcer
 After All – Rejection Overruled
 After All – Waves of Annihilation
 Abiotx – Straight to Hell
 Ancesthor – Beneath the Mask
 Atheist – Piece of Time
 Austrian Death Machine – Total Brutal
 Austrian Death Machine – Double Brutal
 Austrian Death Machine – Triple Brutal
 The Black Zombie Procession – Mess with the Best, Die Like the Rest
 Besieged – Victims Beyond All Help
 Bloodfreak – Scared Stiff
 Brainwreck – Evil Waysl
 Burning Nitrum – Molotov
 Chorpuss – "Witch of the Moor"
 Circle Jerks – VI
 Condition Critical – Operational Hazard
 Dark Angel – Darkness Descends
 Dark Angel – Leave Scars
 Deal With it – End Time Prophecies
 Death – Scream Bloody Gore
 Death – Leprosy
 Death – Spiritual Healing
 Defiance – Product of Society
 Defiance – Beyond Recognition
 Dismantle – Satanic Force
 DSA Commando – Sputo
 Eliminator – Breaking the Wheel
 Elm Street – Barbed Wire Metal
 Evil Survives – Judas Priest Live
 Evil Survives – Powerkiller
 Exeloume – Fairytale of Perversion
 Exeloume – Return of the Nephilim
 Evildead – Annihilation of Civilization
 Evildead – The Underworld
 Evildead – United States of Anarchy
 Faith Or Fear – Instruments of Death
 Fallen Man – Mercenary
 Frade Negro – Black Souls in the Abyss (Brazilian band)
 Frade Negro – The Attack of the Damned
 Gruesome – Dimensions of Horror
 Gruesome – Savage Land
 Gruesome – Twisted Prayers
 Guillotine – Blood Money
 Hell's Domain – Hell's Domain
 Hexen – State of Insurgency
 Hirax – El Rostro de la Muerte
 Holy Grail – Improper Burial
 Hyades – And the Worst Is Yet to Come
 Hyades – The Roots of Trash
 Infinite Translation – Impulsive Attack
 Infinite Translation – Masked Reality
 Killjoy – Compelled by Fear
 Korrosive - Toxic Apokalypse
 Lost Society – Fast Loud Death
 Ludichrist – Immaculate Deception
 Mad Maze – Frames of Alienation
 Massacre – From Beyond
 Massacre – Inhuman Condition
 Megadeth – "Holy Wars... The Punishment Due"
 Megadeth – Peace Sells... But Who's Buying?
 Megadeth – "Hangar 18"
 Megadeth – "No More Mr. Nice Guy"
 Megadeth – Rust in Peace
 Megadeth – Rusted Pieces
 Merciless Death – Evil in the Night
 Municipal Waste – Hazardous Mutation
 Miss Djax – Inferno
 Miss Djax – Stereo Destroyer
 Napalm – Cruel Tranquility
 Necro – The Pre-Fix for Death
 NOFX – S&M Airlines
 Nuclear Assault – Game Over
 Pánico Al Miedo – Pánico Al Miedo
 Pitiful Reign – Visual Violence
 Possessed – Beyond the Gates
 Ravage – The End of Tomorrow
 Red Razor – Beer Revolution
 Ruff Neck – Ruff Treatment
 Sanctuary – Refuge Denied
 Sanctuary – Inception
 Skull Vomit – Deadly Observation
 S.O.B. – Gate of Doom
 Solstice – Solstice
 Steelwing – Lord of the Wasteland
 Suicidal Angels – Dead Again
 Suicidal Angels – Bloodbath
 Suicidal Angels – Divide and Conquer
 Suicidal Angels – "Division of Blood"
 Suicide Watch – Global Warning
 Toxic Holocaust – Hell on Earth
 Toxik – World Circus
 Toxik – Think This
 Ultra Violence – Deflect the Flow
 Ultra-Violence – Privilege to Overcome
 Uncle Slam – Will Work for Food
 Uncle Slam – When God Dies
 Untimely Demise – Black Widow
 Untimely Demise – City of Steel
 Untimely Demise –  Full Speed Metal
 Untimely Demise – No Promise of Tomorrow
 Untimely Demise – Systematic Eradication
 Various Artists – Butchering the Beatles – A Headbashing Tribute
 Various Artists – Thrash or Be Thrashed – An International Tribute to Thrash
 Venom – Here Lies
 Vio-lence – Eternal Nightmare
 Violent Playground – Thrashin Blues
 Whiplash – Unborn Again
 Wrathchild America – Climbin' the Walls
 Wild – Calles de Fuego (Spanish band)
 Wild – La Nueva Orden
 Zero Down – Good Times... At the Gates of Hell
 Zero Down – "No Limit to the Evil"
 Zombis Do Espaco – Em uma missão de Satanas
 Zumbis Do Espaco – Nos Viemos Em Paz

References

External links
 Thrashocore interview

American illustrators
Living people
Album-cover and concert-poster artists
Place of birth missing (living people)
1960 births